Abhaya was king of Upatissa Nuwara (modern-day Sri Lanka) from 474 BC to 454 BC. He succeeded his father Panduvasdeva after being chosen by his siblings as the oldest among them to be the next monarch of Upatissa Nuwara.

See also
 List of Sri Lankan monarchs
 Mahavamsa
 History of Sri Lanka
 Place names in Sri Lanka

External links
 History of Sri Lankan Kings
 Codrington's Short History of Ceylon

Sinhalese kings
5th-century BC Sinhalese monarchs
Monarch of Tambapanni
House of Vijaya